Farouk Abdel Wahab Mustafa (Arabic: عبد الوهاب، فاروق;  – 3 April 2013), pen name Farouk Abdel Wahab, was an Egyptian academic and translator based in the USA. He was born in Tanta and studied at the University of Cairo. He received a BA degree in 1962 and an MA in English literature in 1969.

Early life and education
He pursued doctoral studies at the University of Minnesota, obtaining a PhD in comparative literature in 1977. He taught at the University of Chicago from 1975 until his death. 

He was the first occupant of the university's Ibn Rushd Professorial Lectureship in Modern Arabic Language,  and was also the Associate Director of its Center for Middle Eastern Studies.

Translations 
He was also a noted translator of contemporary Arabic literature. Among his translations are the following:

 A Certain Woman by Hala el Badry
 The Other Place by Ibrahim Abdel Meguid
 No One Sleeps in Alexandria by Ibrahim Abdel Meguid
 Birds of Amber by Ibrahim Abdel Meguid
 Chicago by Alaa el Aswany
 Love in Exile by Bahaa Tahir
 The Lodging House by Khairy Shalaby
 Zayni Barakat by Gamal al-Ghitani
 The Zafarani Files by Gamal al-Ghitani
 The Book of Epiphanies by Gamal al-Ghitani
 Al-A'mal al-Kamila (Complete Works) of Mikhail Roman

He also translated works by Shakespeare and Pirandello into Arabic.

Awards and recognition 
 Mustafa won the 2007 Banipal Prize for his translation of Khairy Shalaby's The Lodging House.

Association 
 Mustafa was a member of the Middle East Studies Association and the Arab Cultural Council of America.

Tribute 

Mustafa died on April 3, 2013.

See also
 List of Arabic-English translators

References

Egyptian academics
University of Minnesota College of Liberal Arts alumni
Arabic–English translators
2013 deaths
People from Tanta
Year of birth uncertain
Cairo University alumni
University of Chicago faculty